Robert Lindsay "Bob" Moses (26 July 1940 – 21 December 2017) was an Australian rugby league footballer who played in the 1960s and 1970s. He was a dual premiership winning player at the South Sydney Rabbitohs.

Playing career
Moses originated from Newcastle, New South Wales, and signed with South Sydney in 1965. He played in the 1965 Grand Final for Souths, but they were defeated by St. George 12-8. He went on to play six seasons with South Sydney between 1965-1970. He played in three more grand finals for Souths, winning the 1967 Grand Final and 1968 Grand Final and played in the 1969 Grand Final loss to Balmain. 

By 1970, he was in reserve grade and his Souths career was over. He moved to Manly-Warringah for three seasons between 1971-1973 but injury curtailed his career at Manly. He did not feature in any other Grand Finals before retiring.

Later life
He later became a successful publican in the Penrith area. Moses death was announced on 21 December 2017.

References

1940 births
2017 deaths
Australian rugby league players
Manly Warringah Sea Eagles players
Rugby league centres
Rugby league locks
Rugby league players from Newcastle, New South Wales
Rugby league second-rows
South Sydney Rabbitohs players